Rudranarayan Raymukhuty was the Maharaja of Bhurishrestha in Bengal. He started rivalry with the Lohani Pathan sultans of Bengal Sultanate.

Early life 
Rudranarayan was born to a Rahri Kulin Brahmin of Bharadwaj gotra in the legendary Raymukhuty (Mukhopadhyay) dynasty of Bhurishrestha. He was the only child of Raja Shivanarayan Ray. Rudranarayan was a supremely skilled swordsman. While a prince, he used to assist his father in managing the affairs of the State. Shivanarayan entrusted the royal duties to his able successor and engaged himself in spiritual activities.

Reign 
After his father died, he acceded the throne of Bhurishrestha. As a ruler he first united the two houses of Pendo and Dogachhia. After that Rudranarayan concentrated on consolidating his control over south western Bengal and large parts of it were brought under the flag of Bhurishrestha. The domain of the kingdom included the present districts of Howrah, Hooghly, East Midnapore, major part of West Midnapore and south western part of Burdwan. He organised the navy. Several men-of-war were stationed in Damodar and Ron. He had garrisoned troops at Tamluk, Amta, Uluberia, Khanakul, Chhaunapur and Naskardanga.

Battle of Tribeni 
After consolidating his position, he concentrated on consolidating a local confederacy to counter the rising Afghan sultans and approached the Mughals and Gajapati Mukundadeva of Odisha. He struck an alliance with Gajapati Mukunda Deva, the ruler of Kalinga. Mukunda Deva who was the ally of Mughal Emperor Akbar, agreed to attack Sulaiman Karrani, the Pathan ruler of Gaur, in case he revolted against the Mughal emperor. The combined forces of Bhurishrestha and Odisha, met the Pathan forces at Tribeni. A heavy battle ensued and the Pathan forces were completely routed. Rajiv Lochan Ray, the brother of Maharaja Rudranarayan, general of Gajapati and the commander-in-chief, of the combined forces showed remarkable valour and bravery. He had literally annihilated the Moslem army. Owing to this victory Maharaja Rudranarayan wrested the control of Saptagram. He built a temple at Tribeni at a ghat at Gajagiri on the banks of Ganga.

Conversion of Kalapahad 
After the defeat in the Battle of Tribeni, Sulaiman Karrani was forced to make peace. He realised that he would never be able to conquer Bhurishrestha unless he could defeat Rajiv Lochan Ray, the brother and general of King Rudranarayan  in the battlefield, which was next to impossible. So he invited him to his palace and trapped him into a love affair with his daughter, Shehzadi Gulnaz. He offered Rajiv Lochan Ray to convert to Islam to which the wily general offered a counter offer, to convert his daughter to Hinduism and marry her. However, Gajapati Mukunda Deva was opposed to such a matrimonial alliance and in accordance to the prevailing practices of Hinduism, decreed that neither Rajiv nor his sons would be allowed to enter the premises of Puri Jagannath temple. Enraged, Rajiv Lochan Ray vowed to take revenge of this insult and destroy the Jagannath temple at Puri. Hence he converted and married Karrani's daughter taking the name of Kalapahad (Black Hill). He led the Moslem Afghan army and attacked Odisha defeated Mukundadeva and sacked major towns and religious places including Hijli, Cuttack, Jajpur, Sambalpur, Konark, Ekamrakhsetra, Puri etc. in 1568. Legend has it that ultimately Kalapahad was drowned in the river by Devi Samaleshwari in Sambalpur, Odisha. In reality, not much is known as to the real reasons for the death of Kalapahad. He may have been killed by certain remnants of the Varendra army of Maharaja Kangshanarayan during his conquest of Gauda.

Conflict with Kotlu Khan 
On account of Kalapahad's conversion, Rudranarayan broke Bhurishrestha's traditional alliance with the Sultanate of Gaur. After the demise of Sulaiman Karrani, Daud Khan Karrani persuaded Rudranarayan for help against the Mughals, but in vain. After him, Kotlu Khan once again approached him for help, but he refused. At this Kotlu Khan decided to attack Bhurishrestha. But intimidated by the might of Bhurishrestha's army and navy, he decided to attack the kingdom from the west. When the news reached Akbar, that the Pathan forces were marching towards Bengal, he dispatched an army of 5000 cavalry under the leadership of Jagat Singh, the son of Man Singh. He sent emissaries to the courts of Bhurishrestha and Bishnupur inviting an alliance.

Kotlu Khan first tried to intimidate the Garhnayak of Mandaran and win him to his side. When he failed, he attacked the fort. Jagat Singh, who had arrived in Jehanabad, attacked Kotlu Khan from the west. The troops of Bishnupur attacked from the north and the soldiers of Bhurishrestha attacked from the east. In the battle, the commander of the fort and Kotlu Khan was killed. Jagat Singh was severely injured. He was saved from Pathan general Osman Khan and carried to Bishnupur and nursed. Osman Khan the Pathan general fled with his troops to Odisha.

Architecture

Notes

References 

 
 

Rulers of Bengal